Thomas Manville Waterland (born December 15, 1933) was a mining engineer and political figure in British Columbia. He represented Yale-Lillooet in the Legislative Assembly of British Columbia from 1975 to 1986 as a Social Credit member.

He was born in Anyox, British Columbia, the son of Tilmer Manville Waterland and Jessica Kelley. In 1956, he married Donelda Catherine Stewart. Waterland lived in Saanichton. He served in the provincial cabinet as Minister of Mines and Petroleum Resource, as Minister of Forests and as Minister of Agriculture. Waterland resigned as Minister of Forests in 1986 after it was disclosed that he had invested in a tax shelter associated with a pulp mill company. He served as president of the Mining Association of B.C. from 1986 to 1993.

References 

1933 births
Living people
British Columbia Social Credit Party MLAs
Canadian mining engineers
Members of the Executive Council of British Columbia
People from the Regional District of Kitimat–Stikine